"Video!" is a song by Jeff Lynne from the soundtrack to the film Electric Dreams in 1984. It is one of two songs that Lynne and keyboard player Richard Tandy provided for the film's soundtrack. The single version is 3:26 in length, while the version included in the film is longer, at 4:18.

The chorus of "Video!" is originally taken from the unreleased Electric Light Orchestra song "Beatles Forever", which was originally to have appeared on the album, Secret Messages, when it was planned to be a double album.

Track listing
All songs written and composed by Jeff Lynne.
"Video!" – 3:26
"Sooner or Later" – 3:51

Charts

References

Jeff Lynne songs
1984 singles
1984 songs
Song recordings produced by Jeff Lynne
Songs written by Jeff Lynne
Songs written for films
Virgin Records singles
Epic Records singles